Shabaqua Corners is a dispersed rural community and unincorporated area in geographic Dawson Road Lots Township in the Unorganized Part of Thunder Bay District in Northwestern Ontario, Canada. There is an Ontario Provincial Police detachment in the community. The Oskondaga River flows through the community to its mouth at the Shebandowan River just to the south.

References

Other map sources:

Communities in Thunder Bay District